Brian T. Field (born December 1, 1967) is an American composer of music for chamber groups, choirs and orchestras. He was also an adjunct professor of music at Columbia University from 1995 to 1997, Seton Hall University in 1997, and American University in 2019.

Life 
Brian Field was raised in Minneapolis, Minnesota and Toledo, Ohio beginning his musical training at age eight; his first serious compositional efforts at age sixteen. He received his undergraduate degree from Connecticut College, where he was a student of Noel Zahler, graduating Magna Cum Laude, Phi Beta Kappa. At Connecticut he received the Rosemary Park Fellowship and was awarded the Mahan Music Prize for Highest Attainment in Music

He earned a M.M. in composition at the Juilliard School in New York, where he was a student of Milton Babbitt, subsequently earning his doctorate in composition as a President's Fellow at Columbia University as a student of Mario Davidovsky and George Edwards.   His doctoral composition and analysis was a work for violoncello quartet, Metamorphoses Messianiques.

Field's self-described musical style is an "eclectic fusion of lyricism and driving rhythm that brings together elements of post-romanticism, minimalism and jazz."

Reviews & Recognition 
First public reviews of Field's work emerged with the release of his String Quartet #1 (2019) on a compilation of string quartets performed by the New York based Sirius Quartet.  Gramophone took note of the work, and wrote that "[Field’s] First Quartet makes me want to hear more. Its four very rhythmic movements are models of concision, real dialogues between the four musicians."  The American Record Guide took particular focus on the second, lyrical movement of the quartet, commenting that "Field's Quartet #1 has a true gem of a second movement: here we get that delicious sense of longing, of needing, as the strings climb higher and higher on their fingerboards: almost like they're attempting to touch heaven."

In 2021, Field released a compilation of his vocal music on the Navona label, which attracted additional attention once again from Gramophone, that wrote "Field’s music has a winning melodic flow and harmonic translucency that make it easy to appreciate." The bi-monthly Fanfare Magazine further commented that "Field’s versatility is both striking and impressive and stretches tonality to and beyond its limits, but always in a soaring, lyrical manner.” The music monthly The Whole Note noted that the recording is "an important disc, no doubt, often dripping with sardonicism and bitterness, shrouded in the music’s frequent dissonance. Gorgeous songs complemented by great choral and solo singing, however, triumph over these feelings, in a program selected and sequenced with uncommon care, with Field drawing on his consummate musicianship fueled by hopefulness."

Awards 

 2003 First Prize, Shoreline Arts Alliance
2003 First Prize, Briar Cliff Choral Music Competition
2005 Artist Fellowship, Connecticut Commission for the Arts
2018 Vienna International Music Competition for orchestral dance suite Shiva Tandava.
 2018 Benenti Foundation Recording Prize
 2018 Alvarez Chamber Orchestra, Mullord Award, for "A Letter from Camp" for soprano and orchestra
 2018 Third Prize, Busan MARU International Music Festival
2018 First Prize, Phinney Ridge Youth Orchestra
2019 First Prize, Malta International Composition Competition
2019 McKnight Foundation/Minnesota Sinfonia Award 
2019 Special Mention, Concours de composition Les Musicales du Centre 
2019 Most Distinguished Musician, Special Mention – IBLA Grand Prize
2019 Second Prize, Academia Musica Vienna
2020 First Degree Award, Golden Key of Vienna International Music Festival
2020 First Prize, Ithaca College Composition Contest
2020 Second Prize, New Vienna Symphony International Composer Competition
2020 First Prize, Malta International Composition Competition
2020 First Prize, Associazione Amici della Musica "Guido Albanese"
2020 Second Prize, Franz Schubert Konservatorium
2020 Special Mention, ORIENT / OCCIDENT Competition
2020 Award of Distinction, Warsaw Wind Ensemble Composition Contest 2020
2020 Third Prize, Franz Schubert Konservatorium
2020 Most Distinguished Musician – IBLA Grand Prize
2021 Honorable Mention, 7° Concorso di Composizione “Città di Albenga”
2021 Second Prize, Golden Key of Vienna International Music Festival
2021 First Prize & Special Prize, Franz Schubert Konservatorium
2021 Second Prize, Voice2Choir, Diaphonia Edizioni
2021 Second Place, VIII International Piano Competition Smederev
2021 Second Prize, 21st Century Talents Music Competition, Ottawa, Canada
2021 Third Prize, Franz Schubert Konservatorium
2021 Grand Prize, International Youth Music Competitions
2021 First Prize & Audience Prize, Rocky Mountain Composition Summer Festival
2021 First Prize, Vienna Academia Musica, 2nd International Music Competition
2021 Silver Medal, Global Music Awards
2021 First Prize, Pianos Créneau Composition Prize
2021 First Prize, ChoralArt Carol Contest
2021 Second Prize, 21st Century Talents Composition Competition
2021 Second Prize, Associazione Cultura e Musica - G. Curci’s International Competition “Città di Barletta”
2021 Second Prize, European Composer Competition, jazz/big band section
2021 First Prize & Audience Prize, Royal Sound Music Composition
2021 Platinum Award, LIT Talent Awards
2021 First Prize, Red Maple Music Competition
2021 First Prize, Constellation: Power of Music
2021 Special Mention, Amsonia International Composition Contest 2021
2021 First Prize & Audience Prize, Royal Sound Music New Year's Competition
2021 Second Prize & Audience Prize, 21st Century Talents New Year's Composition Competition
2021 First Prize & Audience Prize, Rocky Mountain Music Competition New Year's Competition
2021 Grand Prize, Red Maple Music Competition New Year's Competition
2021 Third Prize, Vienna Academia Musica
2021 Gold Medal, Trinity International Music Competition
2021 Silver Medal, International Youth Music Awards, Artist of the Year
2022 First Prize, Golden Key of Vienna International Music Festival
2022 Silver Medal, Global Music Awards
2022 First Prize, VIII Odin International Music Competition
2022 Special Mention, London Classical Music Competition
2022 First Prize, XI Amigdala International Music Competition memorial "Giuseppe Raciti"
2022 Third Prize, Franz Schubert Konservatorium
2022 Platinum Award, 2 Gold Awards, LIT Talent Awards
2022 Third Prize, MaestrosVision International Composition Competition
2022 Grand Prize, Vivaldi International Music Competition
2022 Second Prize, Franz Schubert Music Conservatory
2022 Second Prize, 32nd International Music Competition "Città di Barletta"
2022 Gold Medal, 2022 Quebec Music Competition
2022 Special Prize, Third Prize, Busan MARU International Music Festival
2022 First Prize, Malta International Composition Competition

Discography 

 Tableaux Tartroniques, Album: Contemporary Chamber Music, RMN Classical, release date, April 26, 2019
 String Quartet #1, Album: Playing on the Edge, Navona Records, release date, September 13, 2019
A Letter from Camp, Album: Dimensions Vol. 2, Navona Records, release date, October 11, 2019
From the Clash of Race and Creed, Album: Orchestral Masters Vol. 6, Ablaze Records, release date, October 18, 2019
Κατήχηση, Album: AAKATI, Nous Records, release date, August 15, 2020
Brian Field: Choral and Orchestral Works, RMN Classical, release date, October 15, 2020
Funk-E, Album: Single, Funk-E, Olim Music, release date, October 30, 2020
Brian Field, Symphonic Works, Orpheus Classical, release date, January 8, 2021
Funk & Fire, Olim Music, release date February 15, 2021
Brian Field - Early Works, Olim Music, release date April 6, 2021
Brian Field - String Play, Olim Music, release date April 15, 2021
From the Clash of Race and Creed, Album: Single, Olim Music, release date April 19, 2021
Senex puerum portabat, Album: Single, Olim Music, release date April 26, 2021
String Quartet #1, Album: New Music for String Quartet Vol 3, Phasma Music, release date, May 28, 2021
La coquette heureuse, Album: YODH, Phasma Music, release date, May 28, 2021
Brian Field - Vocal Works, Navona Records, release date, August 13, 2021
Kaleidoscope, Album: Single, Olim Music, release date, March 14, 2022
Three Passions for our Tortured Planet, Novus Promusica, release date, March 10, 2023

References

External links 
 Composer's website
Composer playlist on Spotify

Living people
Columbia University alumni
American composers
Columbia University faculty
Seton Hall University faculty
1967 births